Lijo Jose Pellissery (born 18 September 1978) is an Indian filmmaker and actor who works in Malayalam cinema. Known for his unconventional approach in directing, his films are characterized by nonlinear storylines and very long takes. His best works include Angamaly Diaries (2017),  Ee.Ma.Yau (2018),Jallikattu (2019), and Churuli (2021). He is the son of actor Jose Pellissery.

He is a recipient of the Best Director Award at the 48th Kerala State Film Awards for Ee.Ma.Yau, Best Director Award at the 50th Kerala State Film Awards for Jallikattu, Best Film Award at the 44th Kerala Film Critics Association Awards for Jallikattu and twice recipient of Silver Peacock-Best Director at the 49th International Film Festival of India and 50th International Film Festival of India for his films Ee.Ma.Yau and Jallikattu respectively. He also received the Silver Crow Pheasant Award at the International Film Festival of Kerala 2018.

Pellissery made his debut in 2010 with the crime film Nayakan and followed it up with the crime-drama City of God (2011) and the black comedy satire Amen (2013), the last mentioned, a commercial success at the Kerala box office. His fourth film, Double Barrel, an experimental film received only mixed reviews. His fifth film was again a crime-gangster film Angamaly Diaries (2017), starring almost 90 new actors, which preceded Ee.Ma.Yau, released in 2018. His movie Jallikkattu premiered at the Toronto International Film Festival. In 2020, Jallikkattu was selected as India's official entry for Best International Feature Film at the 93rd Academy Awards.

Early life 
Pellissery was born on 18 September 1978 in Chalakudy in Thrissur district of the south Indian state of Kerala to Lilly and Jose Pellissery, a known film and theatre actor and a winner of a state award for best stage actor. His schooling was at Carmel Higher Secondary School, Chalakudy and, after graduating from the Union Christian College, Aluva, he earned a master's degree in business administration from the Indian Institute of Plantation Management, Bangalore.

Career 
By the time Lijo Pellissery was born, Jose Pellissery who co-owned a theatre group by Sarathy Theatres, was active in Malayalam films and this gave the young Lijo an early grounding in films. His career started as an assistant to Manoj Pillai, an ad filmmaker, and Pellissery soon started making short films of his own. One of his films, 3, was one of three films shortlisted for the best film award at the PIX Short Film Festival 2007. He debuted as a feature film director in 2010 with Nayakan, which narrated the story of a Kathakali artist who joined the underworld to take revenge on those who killed his family. Though the film was critically acclaimed, it failed at the box office. His next venture, City of God, one of the early New Generation films of Malayalam cinema and a multi-starrer featuring Indrajith Sukumaran, Prithviraj Sukumaran, Parvathy, Swetha Menon and Rima Kallingal used hyperlink cinema as its narrative structure and was a critical success but, again failed miserably at the box office; it was pulled from cinemas just days after its release.

It took another two years before he came up with his third movie, Amen, in 2013, which had Indrajith Sukumaran, Fahad Fasil, Swathi Reddy and Kalabhavan Mani in the lead roles and the movie succeeded at the box office while drawing good critical response. After a gap of almost two years, Pellissery released his fourth film, Double Barrel, a comic thriller, with Prithviraj Sukumaran, Indrajith Sukumaran, Arya, Sunny Wayne and Asif Ali in the lead roles. However, the film did not succeed critically or commercially. The next project, Angamaly Diaries, a black comedy cloaked in a gangster plot that revolves around the locale of Angamaly, was scripted by popular actor, Chemban Vinod Jose. The film, made on a small budget of  million, was received well at the box office and drew critical acclaim; Anurag Kashyap opined that Angamaly Diaries was his film of the year. Ee.Ma.Yau, his next film based on a satire written by P. F. Mathews and with his regular composer, Prashant Pillai, scoring the music, was premiered on 30 November 2017 but the release was delayed due to undisclosed reasons. Before it was released on 4 May 2018, the film received the Kerala State Film Award for Best Director at the 48th Kerala State Film Awards. The film also won him the Silver Peacock Award for the best director at the 49th International Film Festival of India (IFFI), 2018, which was held in Goa in November 2018 (Chemban Vinod Jose, the protagonist of the film, also received the Silver Peacock Award for the best actor.) followed by the Sinema Zetu International Film Festival Award for Best Direction.

Filmmaking style
Pellissery often uses non-linear style of narrative and long takes.  His early films had established actors in the lead roles but, Angamaly Diaries marked a change where almost the entire cast were newcomers with 86 new actors making their debut, and subsequently accomplishing a triumph in the form of a 11-minute uninterrupted long take in the climax. Following the similar technique, Jallikattu has at least 6 long takes and have brought in over thousand extras for the climax sequence.

Filmography

Awards

References

External links

Further reading 
 
 

People from Chalakudy
Malayalam film directors
Living people
Film directors from Kerala
Male actors in Malayalam cinema
21st-century Indian male actors
Indian male film actors
Male actors from Kerala
1979 births
21st-century Indian film directors
Kerala State Film Award winners
Malayalam screenwriters
Male actors from Thrissur